Chenzhou or Chen Prefecture was a zhou (prefecture) in imperial China seated in modern Huaiyang County, Henan, China. It existed (intermittently) from the 6th century to 1913.

Between 1734 and 1913 during the Qing dynasty it was known as Chenzhou Prefecture.

Geography
The administrative region of Chenzhou in the Tang dynasty is under the administration of modern Zhoukou in eastern Henan: 
 Huaiyang County
 Zhoukou
 Xiangcheng City
 Shangshui County
 Taikang County
 Xihua County
 Shenqiu County

References
 

Prefectures of the Sui dynasty
Prefectures of the Tang dynasty
Prefectures of the Song dynasty
Prefectures of Later Liang (Five Dynasties)
Prefectures of Later Tang
Prefectures of Later Jin (Five Dynasties)
Prefectures of Later Han (Five Dynasties)
Prefectures of Later Zhou
Prefectures of the Jin dynasty (1115–1234)
Prefectures of the Yuan dynasty
Prefectures of the Ming dynasty
Prefectures of the Qing dynasty
Former prefectures in Henan